TER Lorraine was the regional rail network serving Lorraine region, France. In 2016 it was merged into the new TER Grand Est.

Network

Rail

Road

 Thionville – Bouzonville – Creutzwald
 Remiremont – Bussang
 Remiremont – La Bresse – Gérardmer
 Épinal – Mirecourt – Vittel – Neufchâteau
 Lunéville – Rambervillers – Bruyères
 Béning – Sarreguemines – Bitche
 Sarre-Union – Sarrebourg
 Bitche – Haguenau

Rolling stock

Multiple units

 SNCF Class Z 6300
 SNCF Class Z 11500
 SNCF Class Z 24500
 SNCF Class X 4300
 SNCF Class X 4750
 SNCF Class X 4790
 SNCF Class X 73900
 SNCF Class X 76500

Locomotives

 SNCF Class BB 15000
 SNCF Class BB 16500
 SNCF Class BB 66400
 SNCF Class Z 27500 on order

See also

SNCF
Transport express régional
Réseau Ferré de France
List of SNCF stations in Lorraine
Lorraine

External links
 Official Site